The 1997 Oxfordshire County Council election took place on 1 May 1997 as part of the 1997 local elections in the United Kingdom. All 70 councillors were elected from 70 electoral divisions which returned one county councillors each by first-past-the-post voting for a four-year term of office.

Division Results 
 Denotes sitting councillor

Abingdon Central

Abingdon North

Abingdon South

Bampton

Banbury Easington

Banbury Grimsbury

Banbury Hardwick

Banbury Neithrop

Banbury Ruscote

Benson

Bicester North

Bicester South

Blackbird Leys

Bloxham

Burford

Carterton

Chalgrove

Charlbury

Chinnor

Chipping Norton

Cumnor

Deddington

Didcot Manor

Didcot Mereland

Dorchester

Drayton

Eynsham

Faringdon

Goring

Grove

Hanborough

Headington

Henley North

Henley South

Hinksey

Hormer

Iffley

Kidlington North

Kidlington South

Littlemore

Marcham

Moreton

New Marston

Old Marston

Oxford Central

Oxford Cherwell

Oxford East

Oxford North

Oxford South

Oxford West

Ploughley

Quarry

Shrivenham

Sonning Common

St Clements

Temple Cowley

Thame

Wallingford

Wantage

Wantage Rural

Watlington

Wheatley

Witney North

Witney South

Wolvercote

Wood Farm

Woodstock

Wroxton

Wychwood

Yarnton & Otmoor

References

1997
1997 English local elections
1990s in Oxfordshire